Yi Zhang is a Chinese-American biochemist who specializes in the fields of epigenetics, chromatin, and developmental reprogramming. He is a Fred Rosen Professor of Pediatrics and Professor of Genetics at Harvard Medical School, a Senior Investigator of Program in Cellular and Molecular Medicine at Boston Children's Hospital, and an Investigator of the Howard Hughes Medical Institute. He is also an Associate Member of the Harvard Stem Cell Institute, as well as the Broad Institute of MIT and Harvard. He is best known for his discovery of several classes of epigenetic enzymes and the identification of epigenetic barriers of SCNT cloning.

Education 
Zhang received his B.Sc. and Master degrees in Biophysics from China Agricultural University in 1984 and 1987, respectively. He then received his Ph.D. in Molecular Biophysics from Florida State University in 1995. From 1995 to 1999, He did his postdoctoral training in the lab of Danny Reinberg at the Howard Hughes Medical Institute, Robert Wood Johnson Medical School of the University of Medicine and Dentistry of New Jersey.

Career and research

Appointments 
2012–present  Fred Rosen Professor, Department of Genetics and Pediatrics, Harvard Medical School & Boston Children's Hospital
2005–present  Investigator, Howard Hughes Medical Institute
2007–2013  Founder and scientific advisor of Epizyme, Cambridge, MA
1999–2012  Assistant Professor to Kenan Distinguished Professor, Dept. of Biochemistry & Biophysics, University of North Carolina at Chapel Hill

Research 
Zhang has published more than 180 highly influential papers. These studies have been cited over 81,147 times (H-index 117), making him one of the top 10 authors of high impact papers in the fields of molecular biology and genetics (ScienceWatch 2008), and one of the "most influential scientific minds" (ScienceWatch 2014). He was also a Founder of Epizyme, and NewStem (Natick, MA). His current efforts are focused on the molecular mechanism of embryonic development & reprogramming, brain reward-related learning & memory, pancreatic cancer.

Zhang has made several landmark discoveries in the fields of epigenetics, chromatin and developmental reprogramming.

 Zhang was the first to systematically identify and characterize six histone methyltransferases, including the H4R3 methyltransferase PRMT1, the H3K79 methyltransferase Dot1L, and the H3K27me3 methyltransferase EZH2/PRC2. He went on to demonstrate the function of H3K27me3 methylation in X chromosome inactivation, genomic imprinting, and non-coding RNA regulation. He was also the first to uncover PRC1 as an E3 ligase mediating H2A ubiquitylation. By discovering two enzymatic activities of two PcG protein complexes, Zhang has contributed significantly to our current understanding of the PcG silencing mechanism.
 Zhang was the first to show JmjC domain is a signature motif for histone demethylases. He not only worked out the demethylation mechanism, but also demonstrated that JmjC demethylases can demethylate trimethyl state. Zhang went on to show the diverse function of histone demethylases in  spermatogenesis, metabolism, cancer, iPSC generation, and somatic cell nuclear transfer reprogramming. The last finding overcomes a major barrier in SCNT cloning, contributing to the success of the first primate cloning by a team of Chinese scientists
 Zhang not only discovered 5-formylcytosine (5fC), and 5-carboxylcytosine (5caC) in mammalian genomic DNA, but also elucidated the DNA demethylation mechanism by demonstrating that Tet proteins can sequentially oxidize 5-methylcytosine (5mC) to 5-hydroxymethylcytosine (5hmC), 5fC, and 5caC in a cyclic manner in mouse embryonic stem cells. He continued to reveal the function of Tet proteins in zygotic DNA demethylation, germ cell development, and genomic imprinting erasure
Zhang contributed to the understanding of the molecular events during mammalian embryogenesis by uncovering an important function of de novo nucleosome assembly in nuclear pore complex formation, identifying key factors for zygotic genome activation, revealing a new mechanism of genomic imprinting and imprinted X-inactivation, as well as the role of this new imprinting mechanism in SCNT cloning

Honors and recognition 
2012               Fellow, American Association for the Advancement of Science
2012               Fred Rosen chair, Harvard Medical School & Boston Children's Hospital
2009               Senior Investigator Award, Chinese Biological Investigators Society
2009               Kenan Distinguished Professorship, University of North Carolina-Chapel Hill
2008               The Battle Distinguished Cancer Research Award, University of North Carolina-Chapel Hill
2008               Top 10 authors of high-impact papers by ScienceWatch
2005               Investigator, Howard Hughes Medical Institute
2004               Hettleman Prize for Artistic and Scholarly Achievement, University of North Carolina-Chapel Hill
2000               V. Scholar Award, V Foundation for Cancer Research

References

External links 
 The Zhang Lab
Yi Zhang's Google Scholar Profile

Year of birth missing (living people)
Living people
Epigeneticists
Stem cell researchers
Howard Hughes Medical Investigators
Fellows of the American Association for the Advancement of Science
Harvard Medical School faculty
Chemists from Chongqing
Chinese emigrants to the United States
American biochemists
Chinese biochemists
China Agricultural University alumni
Florida State University alumni
Educators from Chongqing
Biologists from Chongqing